Catullus 11 is a poem by Catullus.

Introduction

Poem 11 is one of the two poems that Catullus writes in the Sapphic meter.  The other, poem 51, is Catullus' version of one of Sappho's poems.  In poem 11, Catullus asks his two friends, Furius and Aurelius, to deliver a message to an unknown girl who is understood to be Lesbia.  This message tells Lesbia that Catullus no longer wants to be with her.

Furius is also mentioned in poems 16, 23, and 26. Aurelius is also mentioned in poems 15, 16, 21.

Critical response

In Catullus 11, there is a different tone in the way Catullus addresses his friends Furius and Aurelius than how they are usually mentioned in other poems.  In other poems, they are usually addressed by Catullus in a condescending manner, but in this poem, he addresses them in a very serious manner.  Also, in the first three stanzas, Catullus implies that he will go with Furius and Aurelius to several different places around the world, trying to express how good of friends they are, but, ironically, he asks them to just walk across the street and break up with his girlfriend without him.  Another unusual thing Catullus does in this poem is that he compliments Caesar in line 10.  This in very uncharacteristic of Catullus as compared to his other poems, as he is usually not very complimentary of Caesar.  Throughout the first half of the poem, Catullus builds a very romantic atmosphere through his writing.  But, in the second half, the mood of the poem turns drastically, as he starts insulting Lesbia.

Furius and Aurelius

Scholars are divided on the interpretation of how Catullus addresses Furius and Aurelius in this poem.  Some think that he is being serious and truly holds Furius and Aurelius as some of his closest friends that he will have until he dies.  Others believe that Catullus has more of an ironic tone.  For example, Catullus' tone switches dramatically in the second half of the poem, as he asks them to just walk across the street to Lesbia after naming all these far away places to go to. This hints that Catullus' tone might be more on the ironical side. But, in general, it can be argued either way, as it seems he is serious in the first half, but this seriousness is deflated in the last 2 stanzas of the poem.

References

C011
Catullus, Poetry
Catullus
Articles containing video clips